Class v. United States, 583 U.S. ___ (2018), is a Supreme court decision related to the ability to challenge the constitutionality of a federal law if the defendant has already pleaded guilty.

Background
A federal grand jury indicted petitioner, Rodney Class, for possessing firearms in his locked jeep, which was parked on the grounds of the United States Capitol in Washington, D. C. See 40 U.S.C. § 5104(e)(1) (“An individual . . . may not carry . . . on the Grounds or in any of the Capitol Buildings a firearm”). Appearing pro se, Class asked the District Court to dismiss the indictment. He alleged that the statute, § 5104(e), violates the Second Amendment and the Due Process Clause. After the District Court dismissed both claims, Class pleaded guilty to “Possession of a Firearm on U. S. Capitol Grounds, in violation of 40 U.S.C. § 5104(e).” App. 30. A written plea agreement set forth the terms of Class’ guilty plea, including several categories of rights that he agreed to waive. The agreement said nothing about the right to challenge on direct appeal the constitutionality of the statute of conviction. After conducting a hearing pursuant to Rule 11(b) of the Federal Rules of Criminal Procedure, the District Court accepted Class’ guilty plea and sentenced him. Soon thereafter, Class sought to raise his constitutional claims on direct appeal. The Court of Appeals held that Class could not do so because, by pleading guilty, he had waived his constitutional claims.

Opinion of the Court

A guilty plea, by itself, does not bar a federal criminal defendant from challenging the constitutionality of his statute of conviction on direct appeal.

See also
2017 term opinions of the Supreme Court of the United States

References

External links
 

United States Supreme Court cases
United States Supreme Court cases of the Roberts Court
2018 in United States case law